Kolijan Rostaq may refer to:
 Kolijan Rostaq District
 Kolijan Rostaq-e Olya Rural District
 Kolijan Rostaq-e Sofla Rural District